Pangborn may refer to:

People
 Clyde Pangborn (1895–1958), American aviator
 Dominic Pangborn (born 1952), Korean-American artist
 Edgar Pangborn (1909–1976), American author
 Franklin Pangborn (1889–1958), American character actor
 Georgia Wood Pangborn (1872–1955), American writer
 Mary C. Pangborn (1907–2003), American writer
 Rose Marie Pangborn (1932–1990), American scientist
 Tom Pangborn (1870–1926), English footballer

Other uses
 Pangborn Hall (University of Notre Dame)
 Pangborn Memorial Airport, Douglas County, Washington, U.S.
 Alan Pangborn, in Stephen King's novel Needful Things and other works

See also
 Pangborn-Herndon Memorial Site, East Wenatchee, Washington
 
 Pangbourne, Berkshire, England
 Pangburn, Arkansas, U.S.